Greatest Hits contains remixes of Glen Campbell's biggest hits. The songs are remixed using purely the original recordings, bringing out other nuances in the arrangements. The last two tracks on this compilation, "Times Like These" and "These Days", were pulled off Campbell's recent studio album Meet Glen Campbell.

Track listing
 "Rhinestone Cowboy" (Larry Weiss) - 3:29
 "Wichita Lineman" (Jimmy Webb) - 3:10
 "Southern Nights" (Allen Toussaint) - 2:59
 "By The Time I Get To Phoenix" (Jimmy Webb) - 2:51
 "Galveston" (Jimmy Webb) - 2:47
 "Try A Little Kindness" (Curt Sapaugh, Bobby Austin) - 2:27
 "Gentle On My Mind" (John Hartford) - 2:56
 "I Wanna Live" (John D. Loudermilk) - 2:47
 "Country Boy (You Got Your Feet in L.A.)" (Dennis Lambert, Brian Potter) - 3:06
 "True Grit" (Don Black, Elmer Bernstein) - 2:31
 "Honey Come Back" (Jimmy Webb) - 3:01
 "It's Only Make Believe" (Conway Twitty, Jack Nance) -2:25
 "Dreams of the Everyday Housewife" (Chris Gantry) - 2:33
 "Hey Little One" (Dorsey Burnette, Barry De Vorzon) - 2:34
 "Times Like These" (David Grohl, Taylor Hawkins, Nate Mendel, Chris Shiflett) - 3:27
 "These Days" (Jackson Browne) - 3:28

Production
Original recordings produced by Al De Lory, Elmer Bernstein, Dennis Lambert, Brian Potter, Gary Klein, Glen Campbell
Tracks 15 and 16 produced by Julian Raymond, Howard Willing
Tracks 1, 2, 4, 5, 7, 15 and 16 mixed by Howard Willing, Julian Raymond at The Record Company
All other tracks mixed by Howard Willing at The Record Company
Project supervision- Matt D'Amico and Sam Nelson
Mastering - Brian Gardner/Bernie Grundman Mastering
Art Direction- Tom Recchion
Design - Greg Ross/Orabor
Photography - Capitol Records Archives

Chart performance

References

2009 compilation albums
Glen Campbell compilation albums